Kharkhiraa ("common crane") is a mountain of the Altai Mountains and is located in the Uvs Province in Mongolia.

See also
 List of mountains in Mongolia
 List of Ultras of Central Asia

References

External links
 Info Mongolia:Uvs aimag

Mountains of Mongolia
Altai Mountains
Uvs Province